Gordon Wray may refer to:

 Gordon Wray (The Bill), a character on the British TV series The Bill
 Gordon Wray (politician) (1951–2009), politician in the Northwest Territories Legislature, Canada